Combining Half Marks is a Unicode block containing diacritical combining characters for spanning multiple characters.

Block

History
The following Unicode-related documents record the purpose and process of defining specific characters in the Combining Half Marks block:

See also 
Combining character
Cyrillic script in Unicode

References 

Unicode blocks